Albert Walter Johnson (April 17, 1906 – September 1, 1998) was a Republican member of the U.S. House of Representatives from Pennsylvania.

Albert W. Johnson was born in Smethport, Pennsylvania.  He attended the Wharton School of the University of Pennsylvania from 1926 to 1929.  He was a member of the Smethport Borough Council from 1933 to 1934.  He received his LL.B. from the Stetson University College of Law in DeLand, Florida, in 1938.   He became a member of the Pennsylvania State House of Representatives from 1947 to 1963 and served as majority whip in the 1951 session, and minority whip in the 1955 session.  He was the majority leader in the 1953, 1957, and 1963 sessions, and the minority leader in the 1959 and 1961 sessions.

He was elected as a Republican to the 88th Congress, by special election, to fill the vacancy caused by the death of United States Representative Leon Gavin, and was reelected to the six succeeding Congresses.  He was an unsuccessful candidate for reelection in 1976.

Johnson died from pneumonia at the age of 92.

Sources

  The Political Graveyard

1906 births
1998 deaths
Republican Party members of the Pennsylvania House of Representatives
Republican Party members of the United States House of Representatives from Pennsylvania
20th-century American politicians
Pennsylvania city council members
Pennsylvania lawyers
Stetson University College of Law alumni
Wharton School of the University of Pennsylvania alumni
People from Smethport, Pennsylvania